Gunvor Hall (November 26, 1908 – November 19, 1961) was a Norwegian actress.

Hall was born in Kristiania (now Oslo), the daughter of the wholesaler Vegard Hall (1876–1928) and Anna Homble (1882–1910). She performed at the Oslo New Theater from 1929 to 1957. She also worked as a film actress, and she debuted in 1939 in Olav Dalgard's film Gryr i Norden (Dawn in the North). She appeared in five films from 1939 to 1958.

Hall married the actor Tore Foss in 1934. She married a second time in 1942, to the singer, theater manager, and poet Jens Gunderssen.

Filmography
 1939: Gryr i Norden
 1942: En herre med bart
 1942: Jeg drepte!
 1944: Kommer du, Elsa?
 1951: Alice in Wonderland (dubbed into Norwegian as Alice i Eventyrland), narrator
 1958: Ut av mørket

References

20th-century Norwegian actresses
1908 births
1961 deaths